Urix is a foreign affairs television newsmagazine aired Monday to Thursday night on the Norwegian television channel NRK2, a subsidiary channel of the Norwegian Broadcasting Corporation (NRK). The first show aired on 2 September 2002, and is produced by the same crew as Dagsrevyen. The title is a play on the word Utenriks, meaning "foreign (affairs)".

Former presenters include Christian Borch, Annette Groth, Bjørn Hansen, Sigrun Slapgard and Gunnar Myklebust.

NRK foreign correspondents  
NRK's correspondents are based in Washington DC (2), Nairobi (2), Beijing, London, Moscow, Berlin (2), Rio de Janeiro and Istanbul.

External links 
 NRK Urix website (in Norwegian)
 NRK Urix TV Archives (in Norwegian)
 NRK Urix Saturdays Radio Archives (in Norwegian)

2002 Norwegian television series debuts
NRK original programming